The 1999 Boise State Broncos football team represented Boise State University in the 1999 NCAA Division I-A football season. The Broncos competed in the Big West Conference and played their home games at Bronco Stadium in Boise, Idaho. The Broncos were led by second-year head coach Dirk Koetter.

The Broncos finished the season 10–3 and 5–1 in conference to win their first Big West title. In their fourth season in Division I-A, the Broncos were invited to their first ever bowl game, the Humanitarian Bowl on their home field, where they defeated Louisville, 34–31.  Boise State won all eight games played on the blue turf of Bronco Stadium in 1999.

Schedule

References

Boise State
Boise State Broncos football seasons
Big West Conference football champion seasons
Famous Idaho Potato Bowl champion seasons
Boise State Broncos football